All We Can is the operating name for the Methodist Relief and Development Fund (MRDF), an international development and emergency relief organisation. It is based at Methodist Church House in London, which is also the Methodist Church of Great Britain's headquarters.

Its activities include:
 Responding to humanitarian crises with emergency relief and helps communities to be better prepared for disasters
 Engaging in global education to inform, challenge, motivate and enable people to take a stance against poverty and injustice.

Y Care International (YMCA's international development and relief agency) and All We Can announced a formal partnership on 1 September 2021 through which the two organisations will aim to "combine their efforts to tackle poverty, inequality and injustice in some of the world’s most vulnerable communities". Y Care International will continue as a separate charitable body, but in future all its services will be fulfilled by All We Can.

Name
The charity's name derives from an apocryphal quote attributed to John Wesley, the founder of Methodism:

Recognition
It is recognised as one of the UK's best charities to work for, having been named in the top five ‘Best Charities to Work For’ by Third Sector 2020, where its child-friendly practices were especially recognised, and is known as one of the sector's most pioneering NGOs in development work and humanitarian aid, shortlisted for the Civil Society Awards 2019.

References

Christian charities based in the United Kingdom
Methodism in the United Kingdom
International development agencies